Mikołaj Bołtuć (21 December 1893 in Saint Petersburg – 22 September 1939 near Łomianki) was a brigadier-general of the Polish Army, commander of the IV Polish infantry Division during World War II.

Early life 
He was the son of Ignacy Bołtuć, General in the Russian Imperial Army of Polish noble descent, and his wife, Anna Łabuńska, of Rzeczyca.

Career 
Bołtuć was enlisted in the Russian Kadet officers school in Omsk when he was seven.

During World War I, Bołtuć served in the Tsarist Army. He fought with distinction in the Finnish Civil War in 1918. After the Bolshevik Revolution, he served as captain in the White Russian Army during the Russian Civil War until the evacuation of Odessa in which he commanded the last leaving vessel.

He returned to Poland and joined the Polish military. He commanded units near Kamieniec, Podolski and elsewhere. During the Soviet-Polish war of 1920, he commanded the unit Strzelcy Kaniowscy. Bołtuć, still a captain, commanded the defence of Zamość. Then he took Wyszków, the location of the puppet government organiced by the Bolsheviks.

During the interwar period, he worked for the General Command and later held command functions in Wilno and Toruń. His nomination to the rank of general was held back for several years, in part because of his anti-religious attitude and his reservations about Poland's military spending patterns. He was known for clarity of judgment and leadership skills.

During World War II, he commanded an Operation Group, a unit short of an army, within the Army Pomorze, the only Polish unit that entered German territory (in East Prussia) for two days during the September Campaign and withstood attacks of much larger German forces. The danger of being flanked forced Boltuc to withdraw to Modlin. When the Modlin Fortress could accept only his officers but not his soldiers, he let his soldiers be demobilised, but most refused to leave. He also encouraged volunteers to go with him to try to sneak through the German Siege of Warsaw. According to written family records, he said while he was leaving home before the war, "This is not the war we are going to win and I am not the kind of a soldier who would surrender".

On the morning of 22 September, he was killed at the Battle of Łomianki from sniper fire while he was leading the charge.

Most of his soldiers were buried at the Łomianki cemetery, near Warsaw. Boltuc's tomb, in a form of a field stone, is at the Powązki Military Cemetery, in Warsaw.

Sources

Monograph: Generał Mikołaj Bołtuć Wizerunek Żołnierza author: Bohdan Królikowski Nakładem Stawarzyszenia Katolików Wojskowych , Warszawa/Warsaw 1998.

1893 births
1939 deaths
Military personnel from Omsk
People from Saint Petersburg Governorate
Polish generals
Polish military personnel killed in World War II
Russian military personnel of World War I
Blue Army (Poland) personnel
Deaths by firearm in Poland